Dinesh Kumar (born 25 August 1988) is an Indian amateur boxer from Bhiwani, Haryana who competed at the 2008 Olympics at light-heavyweight. He is coached by Jagdish Singh.

At the first Olympic qualifier he lost to Zhang Xiaoping 7:25, at the second he KOd two fighters to qualify even though he lost the final to Mehdi Ghorbani. In Beijing he lost his first bout against Algerian Abdelhafid Benchabla.

References

External links
 1st Qualifier
 2nd Qualifier
 India Today article

1988 births
Living people
Indian male boxers
Light-heavyweight boxers
Boxers at the 2008 Summer Olympics
Olympic boxers of India
Boxers from Haryana
People from Bhiwani
Recipients of the Arjuna Award
Asian Games medalists in boxing
Boxers at the 2010 Asian Games
Asian Games silver medalists for India
Medalists at the 2010 Asian Games